A by-election was held for the New South Wales Legislative Assembly electorate of East Sydney on 11 January 1883 because George Reid was appointed Minister of Public Instruction in the Stuart ministry. Such ministerial by-elections were usually uncontested and six ministers were re-elected unopposed. On this occasion a poll was required in East Sydney and Newtown (Henry Copeland). Copeland was defeated but regained a seat in parliament at the second by-election for East Sydney held on 23 January 1883. The six other ministers, Alexander Stuart (Illawarra), George Dibbs (St Leonards), Henry Cohen (West Maitland), James Farnell (New England), Francis Wright (Redfern) and Joseph Abbott (Gunnedah), were re-elected unopposed.

Albert Elkington had been the mayor of Balmain from February 1881 until February 1882.

Dates

Result

George Reid was appointed Minister of Public Instruction in the Stuart ministry.

Aftermath
The following year the Committee of Elections and Qualifications held that an error in the drafting of the constitution meant that Reid could not be validly appointed Minister of Public Instruction, and declared his seat vacant. Reid was defeated in the resulting by-election in February 1884.

See also
Electoral results for the district of East Sydney
List of New South Wales state by-elections

References

1883 elections in Australia
New South Wales state by-elections
1880s in New South Wales